The Scaife Foundations refer collectively to three foundations in Pittsburgh, Pennsylvania. The three subdivisions are: the Allegheny Foundation, the Sarah Scaife Foundation, and the Scaife Family Foundation. A fourth foundation, the Carthage Foundation, was folded into the Sarah Scaife Foundation in 2014.

Allegheny Foundation
Richard Mellon Scaife endowed the foundation and served as its founding chairman. It "concentrates its giving in the Southwestern Pennsylvania area and confines most of its grant awards to programs for historic preservation, civic development and education."

When Scaife died in 2014, he left assets worth $364 million to the Allegheny Foundation. In 2015, the Allegheny Foundation distributed over $25 million to 81 different organizations. The foundation's largest donations went to Point Park University for the Pittsburgh Playhouse and the Center for Media Innovation. The Boys & Girls Club of Western Pennsylvania, Saint Vincent College, the Extra Mile Education Foundation, Goodwill of Southwestern Pennsylvania, and the Ligonier Valley YMCA all received gifts of $1 million or more.

Sarah Scaife Foundation
The Sarah Scaife Foundation does not award grants to individuals.  It concentrates its efforts towards politically conservative causes focused on public policy at a national and international level. From 1985 to 2003 the organization awarded over $235 million to other organizations.

The organizations it has supported include the George C. Marshall Institute, Project for the New American Century, the Institute for Humane Studies, Reason Foundation, and Judicial Watch.

Prior to its 2014 merger, like the Sarah Scaife Foundation, the Carthage Foundation did not award grants to individuals.  It concentrated its efforts towards causes focused on public policy at a national and international level.  From 1985 to 2003 the organization awarded over $68 million to other organizations.

Scaife Family Foundation
The Scaife Family Foundation has funded conservative causes. The Scaife Family Foundation has financially backed Reason magazine and the RealClearInvestigations website. It was among the largest contributors to the climate change denial movement from 2003 to 2010.

The Scaife Family Foundation is controlled by Richard Mellon Scaife's daughter Jennie; who, according to 2014 article in Inside Philanthropy, shifted over time from funding conservative groups to becoming "almost exclusively a supporter of animal welfare and other humanitarian issues." The family foundation has donated significant sums to the University of Pittsburgh.

References

External links
 Scaife Foundations website
 Allengheny Foundation grant recipients from 1985-2006
 Carthage Foundation grant recipients from 1985-2003
 Sarah Scaife Foundation grant recipients from 1985-2003
 Scaife Family Foundation grant recipients from 1985-2001

Political organizations based in the United States
Foundations based in the United States
New Right (United States)
New Right organizations (United States)